Bulhaa Dhombe is a 2009 Maldivian short children's film directed by Yoosuf Shafeeu. Produced by Fathimath Nahula under Crystal Entertainment, the film stars Sheela Najeeb, Hassan Haleem, Mohamed Faisal, Raaidh and Fathimath Aflaz Faisal in pivotal roles. Filming took place in K. Thulusdhoo.

Premise
Faathun (Fathimath Aflaz Faisal) and Ahmed (Raaidh) are two siblings who are poles apart in their negotiations. The former is the acquiescent and thoughtful child and the latter is more of a rebellious child who avoids studying. Receiving complaints from their neighbor, Raaid's mother (Sheela Najeeb) suspects he is dumping school though Faathun continuously covers up for him. Raaid frames his classmate Aabid for theft despite promising his family to rectify his behavior. The next morning Raaid wakes up, turned into a cat, much to the surprise of Faathun. Everyone in the island searches for him while Faathun takes care of the cat reluctant to disclose his identity.

Cast 
 Sheela Najeeb as Raaid's mother
 Koyya Hassan Manik as Mudhinbe
 Mohamed Faisal as teacher
 Raaidh as Ahmed
 Fathimath Aflaz Faisal as Faathun
 Shaifaan Shaheem as Aabid
 Abdulla Mahir as Raaid's father
 Yooshau as Jaufar; Aabid's father

Soundtrack

References

Maldivian short films
2009 short films
2009 films
Films directed by Yoosuf Shafeeu